The R542 is a Regional Route in South Africa that connects Rethabile with Hendrina.

Route
Its western terminus is the R544 at Vandyksdrif, Mpumalanga. It heads east, crossing the R35. It reaches and intersection with the R38, which heads north-east to Hendrina.

References

Regional Routes in Mpumalanga